The Mermaids of Alcatraz Tour was a concert tour by American pop-rock band Train. It was in support of the group's sixth studio album, California 37. The tour began on July 11, 2013, in Virginia Beach, Virginia and ended on August 14, 2013, in Auburn, Washington. The tour was presented by the band's Save Me, San Francisco Wine company. Gavin DeGraw, The Script, and Michael Franti and Spearhead have performed as opening acts. Country music singer Ashley Monroe also made appearances during Train's main set.

Background
The tour was first announced on January 31, 2013. The tour was originally going to be additional dates of the California 37 Tour but the next day on February 1, it was announced that the name of the tour had been changed to the Mermaids of Alcatraz Tour because (they thought that would have a better chance to trend on Twitter). More dates of the tour were announced on March 5, 2013.

As part of the promotion, Train asked for concert-goers to dress up as mermaids and invited some to come on-stage for the group's "Mermaid" song.

Supporting acts
Gavin DeGraw (All shows except for Bristow and Kansas City)
The Script (July 17 – August 14, except for Kansas City)
Ashley Monroe – featured singer in Train's main set.
Michael Franti and Spearhead (July 11–14, 20)

Setlist

"Calling All Angels"
"50 Ways to Say Goodbye"
"If It's Love"
"Get to Me"
"Meet Virginia"
"Feels Good At First"
"Save Me, San Francisco"
"Marry Me"
"Sing Together"
"Mermaid"
"Bruises" (with Ashley Monroe)
"Weed Instead of Roses" (Performed by Ashley Monroe)
Medley: "Free" / "We Can Work It Out" / "All You Need Is Love" (The last two are The Beatles covers.)
"Hey, Soul Sister"
 Drum solo
"California 37"
"Can't Hold Us" (Macklemore & Ryan Lewis cover)
"Drive By"
Encore 
"We Were Made For This"
"This'll Be My Year"
"Drops of Jupiter (Tell Me)"
"The Weight" (with Monroe, Gavin DeGraw and The Script)

Tour dates
Tour dates as posted on Train's web site:

Band
Pat Monahan: Lead vocals, saxophone, guitar
Jimmy Stafford: Lead guitar, mandolin, ukulele, slide guitar, backing vocals
Scott Underwood: Drums, percussion, keyboards, piano
Jerry Becker: Rhythm guitar, keyboards, piano, Hammond organ, slide guitar, percussion, backing vocals 
Hector Maldonado: Bass guitar, rhythm guitar, percussion, backing vocals 
Brian Switzer: Trumpet
Nikita Houston: Backing vocals

References

External links

2013 concert tours
Train (band) concert tours